This is a list of universities in Cambodia.

This is the list of universities in Cambodia according to the Cambodian Ministry of Education, Youth, and Sport. The Cambodian formal education system ceased to exist and many educated people fled the country or died during the Khmer Rouge era (1975–1979). After the fall of the Khmer Rouge, the education system had to be rebuilt from scratch to become what the modern national education system is today, starting from Grade 1 (at age six) to Grade 12 for a total of 12 years of public general education. Exams are held for any potential students to enter higher education institutions and continue their studies.

Public universities

Private universities

See also
Education in Cambodia
Ministry of Education, Youth and Sport, of Cambodia
Accreditation Committee of Cambodia

References

Lists of organisations based in Cambodia
Cambodia
Cambodia